Pseudeutropius is a genus of catfishes conventionally placed in the family Schilbeidae but recent work has suggested it be placed in the newer family Horabagridae, the genus is native to Asia.

Species
There are currently 3 recognized species in this genus:
 Pseudeutropius brachypopterus (Bleeker, 1858)
 Pseudeutropius indigens <small>H. H. Ng & Vidthayanon, 2011
 Pseudeutropius moolenburghae M. C. W. Weber & de Beaufort, 1913

References

Fish of Asia
Horabagridae
Schilbeidae
Catfish genera
Taxa named by Pieter Bleeker
Freshwater fish genera